This article provides details of international football games played by the Indonesia national football team from 1980 to 1999.

Results

1980

1981

1982

1983

1984

1985

1986

1987

1988

1989

1991

1992

1993

1995

1996

1997

1998

1999

References

1980
1980s in Indonesian sport
1990s in Indonesian sport